Shubuta Baptist Church is a historic Southern Baptist church on Eucutta Street at the junction with U.S. Route 45 in Shubuta, Mississippi.

It was built in 1894 and added to the National Register in 1994.

References

Baptist churches in Mississippi
Churches on the National Register of Historic Places in Mississippi
Churches completed in 1894
19th-century Baptist churches in the United States
National Register of Historic Places in Clarke County, Mississippi
Southern Baptist Convention churches
Carpenter Gothic church buildings in Mississippi